The 1988 GTE U.S. Men's Hard Court Championships was a men's tennis tournament played on outdoor hard courts at the Indianapolis Tennis Center in Indianapolis, Indiana in the United States that was part of the 1988 Nabisco Grand Prix. It was the inaugural edition of the tournament and was held from August 1 through August 7, 1988. First-seeded Boris Becker won the singles title.

Finals

Singles
 Boris Becker defeated  John McEnroe 6–4, 6–2
 It was Becker's 4th singles title of the year and the 16th of his career.

Doubles
 Rick Leach /  Jim Pugh defeated  Ken Flach /  Robert Seguso 4–6, 6–3, 6–4
 It was Leach's 5th doubles title of the year and the 7th of his career. It was Pugh's 4th doubles title of the year and the 7th of his career.

References

External links
 ITF tournament edition details

GTE U.S. Men's Hard Court Championships
Atlanta Open (tennis)
Tennis tournaments in Indiana
GTE U.S. Men's Hard Court Championships
GTE U.S. Men's Hard Court Championships
GTE U.S. Men's Hard Court Championships